The Secretariat of the Communist Party of Cuba is an organ of the Central Committee of the Communist Party of Cuba.

History
The Secretariat of the Central Committee was established on 3 October 1965 when the United Party of the Cuban Socialist Revolution was transformed into the present-day Communist Party of Cuba. It was implementing the decisions of the Politburo and Central Committee, and led by the First and Second Secretary of the Central Committee. Of the ten members elected to the Provisional Secretariat three concurrently served as members of the Provisional Politburo.

The Secretariat was abolished at the 4th Party Congress, held on 10–14 October 1991, with the intention of streamlining the party's decision-making process. It was later reestablished at the 5th Plenary Session of the 5th Central Committee on 4 July 2006.

Terms

See also
 Central Committee of the Communist Party of Cuba
 Politburo of the Communist Party of Cuba

References

Specific

Bibliography
Articles and journals:
 

Books:
 

Secretariat of the Communist Party of Cuba
Secretariats of communist parties
1965 establishments in Cuba
1991 disestablishments in Cuba
2006 establishments in Cuba